The Hive is a 2021 drama film written and directed by Christophe Hermans. The story is based on the 2013 novel La Ruche by Arthur Loustalot. The film focuses on the relationship between Alice (Ludivine Sagnier), a mother, and her three daughters.

The film premiered at the 2021 Rome Film Festival. At the 12th Magritte Awards, The Hive received five nominations, including Best Film and Best Director for Hermans.

Cast
 Ludivine Sagnier as Alice
 Sophie Breyer as Marion
 Mara Taquin as Claire
 Bonnie Duvauchelle as Louise

References

External links
 

2022 films
2022 drama films
Belgian drama films
French drama films
2020s French films
Films about mother–daughter relationships